Apriona sublaevis is a species of beetle in the family Cerambycidae. It was described by Thomson in 1878. It is known from Nepal, Vietnam, Myanmar and India.

References

Batocerini
Beetles described in 1878
Beetles of Asia